Fresh Cream is the debut studio album by the British rock band Cream. The album was released in the UK on 9 December 1966, as the first LP on the Reaction Records label, owned by producer Robert Stigwood. The UK album was released in both mono and stereo versions, at the same time as the release of the single "I Feel Free". The album peaked at No. 6 on the UK Albums Chart.

The album was released in a slightly different form in January 1967 by Atco Records in the US, also in mono and stereo versions.

The mono versions were deleted not long after release and for many years only the stereo recordings were available. The UK mono album was reissued on CD for the first time in Japan, by Universal Music, in late 2013 as part of a deluxe SHM-CD and SHM-SACD sets (both editions also contain the UK stereo counterpart).

In January 2017, the album was again reissued, by Polydor, in a 4-CD box-set containing mono and stereo versions of the original UK and US release along with singles and B-sides.

Background
Bass player Jack Bruce later said that the opening song "N.S.U." was written for the band's first rehearsal. "It was like an early punk song... the title meant "non-specific urethritis. It didn't mean an NSU Quickly - which was one of those little 1960s mopeds. I used to say it was about a member of the band who had this venereal disease. I can't tell you which one... except he played guitar."

Reception
In 2012, the album was ranked number 102 on Rolling Stones list of the 500 Greatest Albums of all time (the highest-ranking album by Cream on the list). Uncut describes the songs as "all about playing in a band and relaxing, the joy of being young, and they walk it like they talk it, being jumping-off points for wonderful spur-of-the moment improvisations". Writing for the BBC, Sid Smith notes that "blues, pop and rock magically starts to coalesce to create something brand new". Stephen Thomas Erlewine of AllMusic opined that the album was "instrumental in the birth of heavy metal and jam rock".

Track listing
Original UK release

Original U.S. version

Later U.S. release
Original reissues in the U.S. on RSO/Polydor use the same track listing as the original UK edition given above in which "I Feel Free" is replaced with "Spoonful" on Side 1.  Polydor's original CD release from the 1980s combines the UK and US track lists but also includes "The Coffee Song" and "Wrapping Paper," which were removed from subsequent CD releases starting in the 1990s.

Scandinavian release

An edition released only in Scandinavia was a 12-track release, It had the same ten tracks as the UK version plus added two tracks: "Wrapping Paper", written by Jack Bruce and Pete Brown, and "The Coffee Song", written by Tony Colton and Ray Smith. Both vinyl and cover were made in Germany and exported to the Swedish market only – the German original had the same 10 tracks as the UK. The group didn't want "Coffee Song" to be issued at all, but a mono version was mixed and coupled with "Wrapping Paper" as a single. There were no plans at this stage to release it in stereo, so for the Swedish issue, a crude stereo mix was used. This was made during the sessions in early August 1966 for instructive purpose – the whole track as basic mono is mixed far right and a solo guitar overdub far left. Never intended for release, this mix was soon lost and for later stereo issues a new one was made.

The front cover and record no. (623 031) are the same as the German issue, but three different back covers exist. The first listed the correct 12 tracks, the second listed 10 tracks, and a third where the 12 track listing has been "glued" over the 10 track listing.

PersonnelCreamGinger Baker – drums, percussion, vocals
Jack Bruce – vocals, bass guitar, harmonica, piano
Eric Clapton – guitar, vocalsTechnical'
Robert Stigwood – producer
John Timperley – engineer

Charts

Certifications

References

External links
The making of Fresh Cream - from the Official Ginger Baker Archive

Cream (band) albums
1966 debut albums
Reaction Records albums
Albums produced by Robert Stigwood
Atco Records albums